Igor Knyazev (born 27 January 1983) is a Russian former professional ice hockey defenceman.  Knyazev was drafted in the first-round, 15th overall by the Carolina Hurricanes in the 2001 NHL Entry Draft. He spent two seasons in the American Hockey League with the Lowell Lock Monsters and the Springfield Falcons before returning to the Russian Super League in 2004.

Career statistics

Regular season and playoffs

International

External links

1983 births
Living people
People from Elektrostal
Carolina Hurricanes draft picks
Ak Bars Kazan players
Atlant Moscow Oblast players
HC Dynamo Moscow players
HC Khimik Voskresensk players
HC MVD players
HC Spartak Moscow players
Krylya Sovetov Moscow players
Lowell Lock Monsters players
National Hockey League first-round draft picks
Russian ice hockey defencemen
Springfield Falcons players
HC Vityaz players
Sportspeople from Moscow Oblast